Buri is a municipality in the state of São Paulo in Brazil. The population is 19,965 (2020 est.) in an area of 1196 km². The elevation is 590 m.

References

Municipalities in São Paulo (state)